The Arboretum Burgholz (about 250 hectares) is an arboretum maintained by the Landesbetrieb Wald und Holz Nordrhein Westfalen. It is located in the Staatsforst Burgholz at Friedensstraße 69, Wuppertal, North Rhine-Westphalia, Germany, and open daily without charge.

The arboretum was begun before 1900 to test the suitability of exotic tree species for forestry, and became an arboretum in large part through the efforts of forester Heinrich Hogrebe (1913–1998). It now contains over 130 deciduous and coniferous tree species arranged in North American, Asian, and Mediterranean plantings, with four marked hiking trails.

See also 

 List of botanical gardens in Germany

References 
 Arboretum Burgholz
 Landesbetrieb Wald und Holz NRW entry
 Stadt Wuppertal entry
 Tropengarten entry, with photographs

Arboreta in Germany
Gardens in North Rhine-Westphalia